Irlen spectral filters or Irlen lenses are coloured overlay filters or tinted lenses crafted specifically for the wearer and worn as glasses or contact lenses. They are intended to help people with the supposed perceptual processing difficulty known as Irlen syndrome, also known as scotopic sensitivity syndrome or visual stress, in which sensitivity to specific wavelengths of light provokes difficulty and discomfort when performing visually intensive activities such as reading. The existence of Irlen syndrome is controversial, although there is a small body of research supporting the use of colour to alleviate the symptoms associated with Irlen syndrome.

Scotopic sensitivity syndrome

Scotopic sensitivity syndrome is said to be a visual-perceptual defect related to difficulties with light source, glare, luminance, wavelength, and contrast. According to Irlen, these difficulties lead to reading problems, eye strain, headaches, migraines, and other physical difficulties that can be alleviated by the use of person specific tinted lenses, known as Irlen spectral filters, worn as glasses or contact lenses.

The syndrome has six characteristics:

photophobia
eye strain 
poor visual resolution
a reduced span of focus
impaired depth perception
poor sustained focus

Scotopic sensitivity syndrome is diagnosed by interviewing the client and by observing responses to certain visual tasks such as interpreting geometric figures and reading.

History and research

The idea of page based distortion was initially suggested in 1980 by Olive Meares, to improve the reading ability of people with a learning disability, specifically a certain type of dyslexia. Later this was taken further by psychologist Helen Irlen.  The proposition by Irlen was made at the Annual Meeting of the American Psychological Association in 1983. At that time, there was little research made on the effect of tinted lenses. Irlen gained notable publicity demonstrating the efficacy of her method on television. Tinted lenses became a commercial success, and testing and prescribing centers were opened throughout USA.

Diagnosis of Irlen Syndrome and treatment with Irlen Spectral Filters has been reviewed by the USA Medical Board, and has been determined as not the practice of medicine; it has also been reviewed by various USA Boards of Optometry and has been found not to be the practice of optometry. Binocular and accommodative anomalies may occur in conjunction with the syndrome, but are not considered to be the underlying physiological basis of the condition.

Commercial claims of utility

According to Irlen, the lenses can be used to treat a wide variety of problems that are associated with light sensitivity, discomfort and distortions, including head injury, concussion, whiplash, perceptual problems, neurologic impairment, memory loss, language deficits, headaches and migraine, autoimmune disease, fibromyalgia, macular degeneration, cataracts, retinitis pigmentosa, complications from an eye operation, depression, chronic anxiety and others. She has also claimed that a treatment for scotopic sensitivity syndrome could help a number of incarcerated individuals and delinquent children.

Criticism

The Irlen method has been criticised for being put to the market prior to serious research. According to Helveston, the scotopic sensitivity syndrome and its treatment has, as a phenomenon, resulted in classic group behaviour and has the characteristics of a fad with a charismatic personality as a leader and the supporting evidence being mostly anecdotal—even though those with visual stress are spread around the world, mostly don't know each other, and have no interest in Helen Irlen, all of which conditions would need to be met to fulfill the criteria of group dynamics. A 2002 study by Professor Arnold Wilkins at Essex University, though, indicates that there may be some benefit for reading difficulties , and also for people with migraines.

See also

References

External links
Irlen Institute: FAQ
Irlen patent summary
LDRC: Irlen filters and learning disabilities (review article)
ACNT: Irlen colored filters (review article)
Musatcha.com Irlen Filter - Freeware software color filter
Colour in the treatment of Visual Stress
Color Overlay - Free Irlen filter for Chromebooks

Dyslexia
Pseudoscience